Shahidul Haque Khan is a Bangladeshi film writer, director and lyricist. He won Bangladesh National Film Award for Best Lyrics for the film Chhutir Phande (1990).

Filmography

As a writer 
 Kalmilata – 1981
 Chhutir Phande – 1990

As a director 
 Kalmilata – 1981
 Chhutir Phande – 1990
 Emon Ekta Ma Dena - starring actress Kongkon

As a lyricist
 Kalmilata – 1981
 Chhutir Phande – 1990

Awards and nominations
National Film Awards

References

External links

Living people
Bangladeshi lyricists
Best Lyricist National Film Award (Bangladesh) winners
1948 births